Sugarloaf Rock is a small granite island, with an area of 1.07 ha, in south-eastern Australia.  It is part of Tasmania’s Curtis Group, lying in northern Bass Strait between the Furneaux Group and Wilsons Promontory in Victoria.

Fauna
Recorded breeding seabird species include fairy prion and common diving-petrel.  It is also used as a haul-out site for Australian fur seals.

Flora
Some of the flora that have been recorded on Sugarloaf Rock include the Zantedeschia aethiopica.

See also
The other islands in the Curtis Group:
Cone Islet
Curtis Island
Devils Tower

References

Islands of Tasmania